Springvale or Springvale Station is a pastoral lease that operates as a cattle station in the East Kimberley region of Western Australia. The Springvale Aggregation was created when Springvale was purchased along with Alice Downs, Mabel Downs, and Texas Downs by a South African company in 2003.  the four properties are owned by Harvest Road, an agribusiness owned by Andrew Forrest.

History
J. W. McAdam acquired Springvale in 1932 from E. Bridge and Sons.

The family business Quilty and Sons acquired Springvale in 1948  from W. J. McAdam in 1948. The Quiltys already owned neighbouring Bedford Downs Station.

In 2003 the  property was sold as part of a 15-million four-property deal to South African interests.

Today
In March 2022, Andrew Forrest's agribusiness, Harvest Road, bought the station, along with Mabel Downs, Alice Downs and Texas Downs, together known as the Springvale Aggregation. Together they cover  and are stocked with 35,000 head of cattle. Traditional owners of the land were keen to work with the new owners, hoping for some of the land to be developed as tourist destinations, which would create jobs for Indigenous people in a region which has few opportunities. In addition, with Forrest's known interest in improving the lives of Indigenous peoples, it is hoped that his wealth could be used to improve educational outcomes for children in the Halls Creek area.

See also
List of ranches and stations

References

Stations (Australian agriculture)
Pastoral leases in Western Australia
Kimberley (Western Australia)